Ayios Nikolaos is a former village and present British garrison located in the British Sovereign Base Areas of Akrotiri and Dhekelia in the Dhekelia Cantonment on Cyprus. It is the site of a Green Line crossing point controlled on the one side by Sovereign Base Areas Police and by the police of the de facto state of Northern Cyprus on the other side.

The main road from Larnaca to Famagusta runs through the village.

References

Geography of Akrotiri and Dhekelia
Sovereign Base Areas
Border crossings of Cyprus
Border crossings in divided regions
Borders of Akrotiri and Dhekelia